Mole Gap to Reigate Escarpment  is a  biological and geological Site of Special Scientific Interest west of Reigate in Surrey. It is a Geological Conservation Review site and a Special Area of Conservation. Part of it is a Nature Conservation Review site, Grade I. Two small private nature reserves in the site are managed by the Surrey Wildlife Trust, Dawcombe and Fraser Down.

This eight mile long site on the North Downs contains an outstanding range of wildlife habitats, including large areas of woodland and chalk grassland. Mole Gap has a variety of Quaternary landforms and there are well developed river cliffs where alluvial fans have diverted the River Mole against the valley sides.

References

External links
Surrey County Council map of SSSIs

Sites of Special Scientific Interest in Surrey
Geological Conservation Review sites
Nature Conservation Review sites
Special Areas of Conservation in England